The Mali Rugby Federation is the governing body for rugby union in Mali. It is a member of the Rugby Africa and an associate member of the World Rugby.

References

Rugby union governing bodies in Africa
Rugby union in Mali